Kevin Anthony Jackson (born 30 November 1964), also known by his stage name Sanchez, is a Jamaican reggae and gospel reggae singer-songwriter and record producer.

Biography
Born in Kingston, Jackson grew up in the Stony Hill and Waterford areas. He was given the nickname 'Sanchez' due to his skills – a reference to a footballer of that name. He sang from an early age in the Rehoboth Apostolic Church choir in St Catherine. After working with several Kingston sound systems, first as selector for the Rambo Mango sound system, he began recording and had his first hit with "Lady In Red", recorded for producer Red Man in 1987. By 1988 he was one of Jamaica's most popular singers, and at his performance at Reggae Sunsplash that year he was called back for six encores. He had further hits with "Loneliness Leave Me Alone", produced by Winston Riley, and with his version of Tracy Chapman's "Baby Can I Hold You", which was included on the Philip "Fatis" Burrell-produced Number One album (1989). He has worked with several of Jamaica's other top producers, including King Jammy, Bobby Digital, and Donovan Germain.

His 2000 album Simply Being Me reached number 14 on the US Billboard Top Reggae Albums chart, and 2002's Stays on My Mind hit number 9.

Primarily known for love songs and cover versions of pop and R&B songs, in the 1990s he mixed gospel themes with other topics on his albums, and released the totally gospel Who is This Man in 1999 and He's Got the Power in 2003.

In 2012 he revealed that he is now "a full-time producer", and has been working with studio engineer and writer Rodnie "Tenor" Lion. In May he revealed that he was working on two self-produced albums, one dancehall (Like a General) and one gospel (There is no Other Like You Lord).

Discography

Albums

Split albums
 Pinchers Meets Sanchez (with Pinchers) (1989), Exterminator
 Wayne Wonder & Sanchez Part 1 (with Wayne Wonder) (1989), Penthouse
 Wayne Wonder & Sanchez Part 2 (with Wayne Wonder) (1990), Penthouse
 Sanchez Meets Cocoa Tea (with Cocoa Tea) (1993), Sonic Sounds
 Thriller U & Sanchez (with Thriller U)  (1996), Record Factory
 Toe 2 Toe Vol. 7 (with Ghost) (2003), Jet Star

Compilations albums
 Sanchez Vol. 1 (1994), Penthouse
 Sanchez Vol. 2 (1994), Penthouse
 One in a Million: The Best of Sanchez (1997), VP 
 Reggae Max (2000), Jet Star
 The Best of Sanchez: Back at One (2001), VP 
 Reggae Legends: Sanchez (2009), VP

References

External links
 Official Sanchez Website
 

Jamaican reggae musicians
Jamaican male singers
Jamaican gospel singers
1964 births
Living people
Musicians from Kingston, Jamaica
VP Records artists